Daruma sagamia is a species of marine ray-finned fish belonging to the family Cottidae, the typical sculpins. This species is found in the Pacific Ocean waters around Japan. This species grows to a length of  SL. This species is the only known member of its genus.

References
 

Cottinae
Fish described in 1904
Taxa named by David Starr Jordan
Taxa named by Edwin Chapin Starks